Michael Andersson may refer to:
 Michael Andersson (cyclist) (born 1967), retired road bicycle racer from Sweden
 Michael Andersson (footballer) (born 1959), Swedish former football player and manager
 Michael Andersson (rugby league), Cook Islander rugby league footballer

See also
 Michael Anderson (disambiguation)
 Mikael Andersson (disambiguation)